Cesar Daniel Meza Colli (born 5 October 1991) is a Paraguayan professional footballer who plays as a midfielder or forward for Azerbaijani club Neftçi.

Career
Colli made his debut on 21 September 2011 for Cesena, against Lazio.

On 5 January 2012, he left for Deportivo Alavés. On 2 August 2012 he was signed by A.C. Pavia in temporary deal for undisclosed fee, which deducted from the transfer fee of another player.

On 3 September 2013, César and his brother David signed for Azerbaijan Premier League side Inter Baku in a one-year contract. Meza signed a new 1-year contract with Inter Baku in May 2014.

After leaving Inter Baku in the summer of 2015, Colli signed a six-month contract with Inter Baku on 22 January 2016. Six-months later Colli signed a one-year contract with Zira FK.

On 6 February 2018, Keşla FK announced the signing of Colli on a contract until the end of the 2017–18 season.

On 6 August 2018, Universitatea Craiova announced the signing of Colli on a three-year contract.

On 22 July 2019, Keşla FK announced the signing of Colli on one-year long loan. On 18 September 2020, Colli returned to Keşla on a contract until the end of the 2020–21 season.

On 12 June 2021, Neftçi PFK announced the signing of Colli to a two-year contract.

Career statistics

References

External links 
 
 Player Stats at tuttocalciatori.net

Living people
1991 births
Association football midfielders
Association football forwards
Paraguayan footballers
A.C. Cesena players
Deportivo Alavés players
F.C. Pavia players
Shamakhi FK players
Zira FK players
CS Universitatea Craiova players
Serie A players
Segunda División B players
Azerbaijan Premier League players
Liga I players
Paraguayan expatriate footballers
Paraguayan expatriate sportspeople in Italy
Paraguayan expatriate sportspeople in Azerbaijan
Paraguayan expatriate sportspeople in Romania
Expatriate footballers in Italy
Expatriate footballers in Spain
Expatriate footballers in Azerbaijan
Expatriate footballers in Romania